These species belong to Stenotabanus, a genus of horse flies in the family Tabanidae.

Stenotabanus species

Stenotabanus abacus Philip, 1954
Stenotabanus aberrans Philip, 1966
Stenotabanus alayoi Cruz & García, 1974
Stenotabanus albidocinctus (Bigot, 1892)
Stenotabanus albilinearis Philip, 1960
Stenotabanus albiscutellatus Chainey, 1999
Stenotabanus alticolus Fairchild, 1980
Stenotabanus atlanticus (Johnson, 1914)
Stenotabanus barahona Fairchild, 1980
Stenotabanus batesi (Bequaert, 1940)
Stenotabanus bequaerti Rafael, Fairchild & Goarayeb, 1982
Stenotabanus blantoni Fairchild, 1953
Stenotabanus braziliensis Chainey & Gorayeb, 1999
Stenotabanus brevistylatus Kröber, 1929
Stenotabanus brodzinskyi Lane, Poinar & Fairchild, 1988
Stenotabanus bruesi (Hine, 1920)
Stenotabanus brunetii (Bequaert, 1940)
Stenotabanus brunneus Wilkerson, 1979
Stenotabanus brunnipennis Kröber, 1930
Stenotabanus brunnipes Kröber, 1929
Stenotabanus calvitius Fairchild, 1942
Stenotabanus cerrascoi Henriques & Krolow, 2020
Stenotabanus chaineyi Henriques & Krolow, 2020
Stenotabanus changuinolae Fairchild, 1942
Stenotabanus chiapanensis Fairchild, 1953
Stenotabanus chrysonotus Wilkerson, 1979
Stenotabanus cinereus (Wiedemann, 1821)
Stenotabanus cipoensis Chainey, 1999
Stenotabanus clavijoi Gorayeb, Tiape Gomez & Valásquez de Rios, 2013
Stenotabanus confusus Cruz & García, 1974
Stenotabanus cretatus Fairchild, 1961
Stenotabanus cribellum (Osten Sacken, 1886)
Stenotabanus detersus (Walker, 1850)
Stenotabanus dusbabeki Cruz & García, 1974
Stenotabanus fairchildi Chvála, 1967
Stenotabanus farri Philip, 1958
Stenotabanus fenestra (Williston, 1887)
Stenotabanus flavidus (Hine, 1904)
Stenotabanus floridensis (Hine, 1912)
Stenotabanus fuliginosus (Lutz & Neiva, 1914)
Stenotabanus fulvistriatus (Hine, 1912)
Stenotabanus fumipenns Kröber, 1929
Stenotabanus geijskesi Fairchild, 1953
Stenotabanus guttatulus (Townsend, 1893)
Stenotabanus henriquesi Chainey, 1999
Stenotabanus hispaniolae (Bequaert, 1940)
Stenotabanus hyalinalis Chainey, Hall & Gorayeb, 1999
Stenotabanus incipiens (Walker, 1860)
Stenotabanus indotatus Ibáñez-Bernal, 1991
Stenotabanus irregularis Chainey & Hall, 1999
Stenotabanus ixyostactes (Wiedemann, 1828)
Stenotabanus jamaicensis (Newstead, 1909)
Stenotabanus liokylon Fairchild, 1961
Stenotabanus litotes Fairchild, 1953
Stenotabanus littoreus (Hine, 1907)
Stenotabanus longipennis Kröber, 1929
Stenotabanus luteolineatus Wilkerson, 1979
Stenotabanus macroceras Philip, 1960
Stenotabanus marcanoi Fairchild, 1980
Stenotabanus mellifluus (Bequaert, 1940)
Stenotabanus mexicanus Philip, 1977
Stenotabanus minusculus (Kröber, 1930)
Stenotabanus neivai Borgmeier, 1933
Stenotabanus nervosus (Curran, 1931)
Stenotabanus nigriculus Wilkerson, 1979
Stenotabanus nigriscapus Chainey & Hall, 1999
Stenotabanus obscuremarginatus Kröber, 1929
Stenotabanus obscurus Kröber, 1929
Stenotabanus oleariorum Strelow, Solórzano-Kraemer, Ibáñez-Bernal & Rust, 2013
Stenotabanus paitillensis Fairchild, 1942
Stenotabanus pallidicornis Kröber, 1929
Stenotabanus pallipes Kröber, 1929
Stenotabanus paradoxus (Lutz, 1913)
Stenotabanus parallelus (Walker, 1848)
Stenotabanus parsonsi (Bequaert, 1940)
Stenotabanus parvulus (Williston, 1887)
Stenotabanus pechumani Philip, 1966
Stenotabanus penai Chainey, 1999
Stenotabanus peruviensis Kröber, 1929
Stenotabanus picticornis (Bigot, 1892)
Stenotabanus platyfrons Fairchild, 1964
Stenotabanus pompholyx Fairchild, 1953
Stenotabanus psammophilus (Osten Sacken, 1876)
Stenotabanus pseudotaeniotes Kröber, 1929
Stenotabanus pumiloides (Williston, 1901)
Stenotabanus pusillus Cruz & García, 1974
Stenotabanus quinquestriatus Kröber, 1929
Stenotabanus roxannae Wilkerson, 1979
Stenotabanus sandyi Gorayeb, 1988
Stenotabanus sordidatus Fairchild, 1958
Stenotabanus sphaeriscapus Wilkerson, 1985
Stenotabanus sputnikulus Philip, 1958
Stenotabanus staryi Fairchild, 1968
Stenotabanus stigma (Fabricius, 1805)
Stenotabanus stonei Philip, 1958
Stenotabanus subtilis (Bellardi, 1862)
Stenotabanus taeniotes (Wiedemann, 1828)
Stenotabanus tenuistria Fairchild, 1961
Stenotabanus tobagensis Fairchild, 1958
Stenotabanus trilunatus Philip, 1968
Stenotabanus trinotatus (Wiedemann, 1828)
Stenotabanus vitripennis (Lutz, 1913)
Stenotabanus wilkersoni Chainey, 1999
Stenotabanus wolcotti Fairchild, 1980
Stenotabanus woodruffi Fairchild & Lane, 1989

References

Stenotabanus